The Levy County Courthouse, built in 1937, is a historic redbrick Classical Revival style courthouse building located  in  Bronson, Florida. It was designed by architect Henry L. Taylor and built by O. R. Woodcock.  It is Levy County's fourth purpose-built courthouse and the third one built in Bronson. Some material salvaged from the previous (1906) courthouse were used in its construction. An annex has been added to it.

In 1989, the Levy County Courthouse was listed in A Guide to Florida's Historic Architecture, published by the University of Florida Press.

References

External links
 Florida's Historic Courthouses

Buildings and structures in Levy County, Florida
County courthouses in Florida
1937 establishments in Florida
Government buildings completed in 1937